Mādhava of Sangamagrāma (Mādhavan) (c. 1340 – c. 1425) was an Indian mathematician and astronomer who is considered as the founder of the Kerala school of astronomy and mathematics. One of the greatest mathematician-astronomers of the Middle Ages, Madhava made pioneering contributions to the study of infinite series, calculus, trigonometry, geometry, and algebra. He was the first to use infinite series approximations for a range of trigonometric functions, which has been called the "decisive step onward from the finite procedures of ancient mathematics to treat their limit-passage to infinity".

Biography
Little is known about Mādhava‘s life with certainty. However, from scattered references to Mādhava found in diverse manuscripts, historians of Kerala school have pieced together informations about the mathematician. In a manuscript preserved in the Oriental Institute, Baroda, Madhava has been referred to as Mādhavan vēņvārōhādīnām karttā ... Mādhavan Ilaññippaļļi Emprān.  It has been noted that the epithet ‘Emprān’ refers to the  Emprāntiri community, to which Madhava might have belonged to.

The term "Ilaññippaļļi" has been identified as a reference to the residence of Mādhava. This is corroborated by Mādhava himself. In his short work on the moon’s positions titled Veņvāroha, Mādhava says that he was born in a house named bakuļādhişțhita . . . vihāra. This is clearly a Sanskritisation of Ilaññippaļļi. Ilaññi is the Malayalam name of the evergreen tree  Mimusops elengi and the Sanskrit name for the same is Bakuļa. Palli is a Dravidian term for Buddhist vihāras. The Sanskrit house name bakuļādhişțhita . . . vihāra has also been interpreted as a reference to the Malayalam house name Iraññi ninna ppaļļi and some historians have tried to identify it with one of two currently existing houses with names Iriññanavaļļi and Iriññārapaļļi both of which are located near Irinjalakuda town in central Kerala. This identification is far fetched because both names have neither phonetic similarity nor semantic equivalence to the word "Ilaññippaļļi".  

Most of the writers of astronomical and mathematical works who lived after Madhava's period have referred to Madhava as "Sangamagrama Madhava" and as such it is important that the real import of the word "Sangamagrama" be made clear. The general view among many scholars is that Sangamagrama is the town of Irinjalakkuda some 70 kilometers south of the Nila river and about 70 kilometers south of Cochin. It seems that there is not much concrete ground for this belief except perhaps the fact that the presiding deity of an early medieval temple in the town, the Koodalmanikyam Temple, is worshiped as Sangameswara meaning the Lord of the Samgama and so Samgamagrama can be interpreted as the village of Samgameswara. But there are several places in Karnataka with samgama or its Dravidian equivalent kūḍala in their names and with a temple dedicated to Samgamḗsvara, the lord of the confluence. (Kudalasangama in Bagalkote district is one such place with a celebrated temple dedicated to the Lord of the Samgama.)

There is a small town on the southern banks of the Nila river, around 10 kilometers upstream from Tirunavaya, called Kūḍallūr. The exact literal Sanskrit translation of this place name is Samgamagram: kūṭal in Malayalam means a confluence (which in Sanskrit is samgama) and ūr means a village (which in Sanskrit is grama). Also the place is at the confluence of the Nila river and its most important tributary, namely, the Kunti river. (There is no confluence of rivers near Irinjalakuada.) Incidentally there is still existing a Namputhiri (Malayali Brahmin) family by name Kūtallūr Mana a few kilometers away from the Kudallur village. The family has its origins in Kudallur village itself. For many generations this family hosted a great Gurukulam specialising in Vedanga. That the only available manuscript of Sphutachandrapti, a book authored by Madhava, was obtained from the manuscript collection of Kūtallūr Mana might strengthen the conjecture that Madhava might have had some association with Kūtallūr Mana. Thus the most plausible possibility is that the forefathers of Madhava migrated from the Tulu land or thereabouts to settle in Kudallur village, which is situated on the southern banks of the Nila river not far from Tirunnavaya, a generation or two before his birth and lived in a house known as Ilaññippaļļi whose present identity is unknown.

Date
There are also no definite evidences to pinpoint the period during which Madhava flourished. In his Venvaroha, Madhava gives a date in 1400 CE as the epoch. Madhava's pupil Paramesvara, the only known direct pupil of Madhava, is known to have completed his seminal work Drigganita in 1430 and the Paramesvara's date has been determined as c.1360-1455. From such circumstantial evidences historians have assigned the date c. 1340 – c. 1425 to Madhava.

Historiography 
Although there is some evidence of mathematical work in Kerala prior to Madhava (e.g., Sadratnamala  c. 1300, a set of fragmentary results), it is clear from citations that Madhava provided the creative impulse for the development of a rich mathematical tradition in medieval Kerala.  However, except for a couple, most of Madhava's original works have been lost. He is referred to in the work of subsequent Kerala mathematicians, particularly in Nilakantha Somayaji's Tantrasangraha (c. 1500), as the source for several infinite series expansions, including sin θ and arctan θ.  The 16th-century text Mahajyānayana prakāra (Method of Computing Great Sines) cites Madhava as the source for several series derivations for π.  In Jyeṣṭhadeva's Yuktibhāṣā (c. 1530), written in Malayalam, these series are presented with proofs in terms of the Taylor series expansions for polynomials like 1/(1+x2), with x = tan θ, etc.

Thus, what is explicitly Madhava's work is a source of some debate.  The Yukti-dipika (also called the Tantrasangraha-vyakhya), possibly composed by Sankara Variyar, a student of Jyeṣṭhadeva, presents several versions of the series expansions for sin θ, cos θ, and arctan θ, as well as some products with radius and arclength, most versions of which appear in Yuktibhāṣā.  For those that do not, Rajagopal and Rangachari have argued, quoting extensively from the original Sanskrit, that since some of these have been attributed by Nilakantha to Madhava, some of the other forms might also be the work of Madhava.

Others have speculated that the early text Karanapaddhati (c. 1375–1475), or the Mahajyānayana prakāra was written by Madhava, but this is unlikely.

Karanapaddhati, along with the even earlier Keralite mathematics text Sadratnamala, as well as the Tantrasangraha and Yuktibhāṣā, were considered in an 1834 article by Charles Matthew Whish, which was the first to draw attention to their priority over Newton in discovering the Fluxion (Newton's name for differentials). In the mid-20th century, the Russian scholar Jushkevich revisited the legacy of Madhava, and a comprehensive look at the Kerala school was provided by Sarma in 1972.

Lineage 

There are several known astronomers who preceded Madhava, including Kǖţalur Kizhār (2nd century), Vararuci (4th century), and Sankaranarayana (866 AD).  It is possible that other unknown figures preceded him.  However, we have a clearer record of the tradition after Madhava.  Parameshvara was a direct disciple.  According to a palm leaf manuscript of a Malayalam commentary on the Surya Siddhanta, Parameswara's son Damodara (c. 1400–1500) had Nilakantha Somayaji as one of his disciples. Jyeshtadeva was a disciple of Nilakantha. Achyuta Pisharati of
Trikkantiyur is mentioned as a disciple of Jyeṣṭhadeva, and the grammarian Melpathur Narayana Bhattathiri as his disciple.

Contributions

If we consider mathematics as a progression from finite processes of algebra to considerations of the infinite, then the first steps towards this transition typically come with infinite series expansions. It is this transition to the infinite series that is attributed to Madhava. In Europe, the first such series were developed by James Gregory in 1667. Madhava's work is notable for the series, but what is truly remarkable is his estimate of an error term (or correction term). This implies that he understood very well the limit nature of the infinite series.  Thus, Madhava may have invented the ideas underlying infinite series expansions of functions, power series, trigonometric series, and rational approximations of infinite series.

However, as stated above, which results are precisely Madhava's and which are those of his successors is difficult to determine.  The following presents a summary of results that have been attributed to Madhava by various scholars.

Infinite series

Among his many contributions, he discovered infinite series for the trigonometric functions of sine, cosine, arctangent, and many methods for calculating the circumference of a circle. One of Madhava's series is known from the text Yuktibhāṣā, which contains the derivation and proof of the power series for inverse tangent, discovered by Madhava. In the text, Jyeṣṭhadeva describes the series in the following manner:

This yields:

or equivalently:

This series is Gregory's series (named after James Gregory, who rediscovered it three centuries after Madhava).  Even if we consider this particular series as the work of Jyeṣṭhadeva, it would pre-date Gregory by a century, and certainly other infinite series of a similar nature had been worked out by Madhava.  Today, it is referred to as the Madhava-Gregory-Leibniz series.

Trigonometry

Madhava composed an accurate table of sines. Madhava's values are accurate to the seventh decimal place. Marking a quarter circle at twenty-four equal intervals, he gave the lengths of the half-chord (sines) corresponding to each of them. It is believed that he may have computed these values based on the series expansions:

   sin q = q − q3/3! + q5/5! − q7/7! + ...
   cos q = 1 − q2/2! + q4/4! − q6/6! + ...

The value of π (pi)

Madhava's work on the value of the mathematical constant Pi is cited in the Mahajyānayana prakāra ("Methods for the great sines").  While some scholars such as Sarma feel that this book may have been composed by Madhava himself, it is more likely the work of a 16th-century successor. This text attributes most of the expansions to Madhava, and gives the following infinite series expansion of π, now known as the Madhava-Leibniz series:

 

which he obtained from the power-series expansion of the arc-tangent function. However, what is most impressive is that he also gave a correction term Rn for the error after computing the sum up to n terms, namely:

 Rn = (−1)n / (4n), or
 Rn = (−1)n⋅n / (4n2 + 1), or
 Rn = (−1)n⋅(n2 + 1) / (4n3 + 5n),

where the third correction leads to highly accurate computations of π.

It has long been speculated how Madhava found these correction terms. They are the first three convergents of a finite continued fraction, which, when combined with the original Madhava's series evaluated to n terms, yields about 3n/2 correct digits:

 

The absolute value of the correction term in next higher order is

 |Rn| = (4n3 + 13n) / (16n4 + 56n2 + 9).

He also gave a more rapidly converging series by transforming the original infinite series of π, obtaining the infinite series

 

By using the first 21 terms to compute an approximation of π, he obtains a value correct to 11 decimal places (3.14159265359).
The value of 3.1415926535898, correct to 13 decimals, is sometimes attributed to Madhava, but may be due to one of his followers. These were the most accurate approximations of π given since the 5th century (see History of numerical approximations of π).

The text Sadratnamala appears to give the astonishingly accurate value of π = 3.14159265358979324 (correct to 17 decimal places). Based on this, R. Gupta has suggested that this text was also composed by Madhava.

Madhava also carried out investigations into other series for arc lengths and the associated approximations to rational fractions of π, found methods of polynomial expansion, discovered tests of convergence of infinite series, and the analysis of infinite continued fractions.
He also discovered the solutions of transcendental equations by iteration and found the approximation of transcendental numbers by continued fractions.

Calculus
Madhava laid the foundations for the development of calculus, which were further developed by his successors at the Kerala school of astronomy and mathematics. (Certain ideas of calculus were known to earlier mathematicians.) Madhava also extended some results found in earlier works, including those of Bhāskara II. However, they did not combine many differing ideas under the two unifying themes of the derivative and the integral, show the connection between the two, and turn calculus into the powerful problem-solving tool we have today.

Madhava's works
K. V. Sarma has identified Madhava as the author of the following works:

 Golavada
 Madhyamanayanaprakara
 Mahajyanayanaprakara (Method of Computing Great Sines)
 Lagnaprakarana
 Venvaroha
 Sphutacandrapti
 Aganita-grahacara
 Chandravakyani (Table of Moon-mnemonics)

Kerala School of Astronomy and Mathematics

The Kerala school of astronomy and mathematics flourished for at least two centuries beyond Madhava.  In Jyeṣṭhadeva we find the notion of integration, termed sankalitam, (lit. collection), as in the statement:

ekadyekothara pada sankalitam samam padavargathinte pakuti,

which translates as the integral of a variable (pada) equals half that
variable squared (varga); i.e. The integral of x dx is equal to
x2 / 2.  This is clearly a start to the process of integral calculus.
A related result states that the area under a curve is its integral. Most of these results pre-date similar results in Europe by several centuries.
In many senses,
Jyeshthadeva's Yuktibhāṣā may be considered the world's first calculus text.

The group also did much other work in astronomy; indeed many more pages are developed to astronomical computations than are for discussing analysis related results.

The Kerala school also contributed much to linguistics (the relation between language and mathematics is an ancient Indian tradition, see Katyayana). The ayurvedic and poetic traditions of Kerala can also be traced back to this school.  The famous poem, Narayaneeyam, was composed by Narayana Bhattathiri.

Influence

Madhava has been called "the greatest mathematician-astronomer of medieval India", or as
"the founder of mathematical analysis; some of his discoveries in this field show him to have possessed extraordinary intuition". O'Connor and Robertson state that a fair assessment of Madhava is that
he took the decisive step towards modern classical analysis.

Possible propagation to Europe

The Kerala school was well known in the 15th and 16th centuries, in the period of the first contact with European navigators in the Malabar Coast.  At the time, the port of Muziris, near Sangamagrama, was a major center for maritime trade, and a number of Jesuit missionaries and traders were active in this region.  Given the fame of the Kerala school, and the interest shown by some of the Jesuit groups during this period in local scholarship, some scholars, including G. Joseph of the U. Manchester have suggested that the writings of the Kerala school may have also been transmitted to Europe around this time, which was still about a century before Newton.

See also

Madhava's sine table 
Madhava series
Madhava's correction term
Venvaroha
Ganita-yukti-bhasa                   
Kerala school of astronomy and mathematics
List of Indian mathematicians                                    
Indian mathematics                         
History of calculus

Entities named after Madhava
Madhava Observatory

References

External links
 Biography on MacTutor

1340s births
1420s deaths
Scientists from Kerala
History of calculus
Indian Hindus
Kerala school of astronomy and mathematics
14th-century Indian mathematicians
15th-century Indian mathematicians
People from Irinjalakuda
15th-century Indian astronomers
14th-century Indian astronomers
Scholars from Kerala
Mathematical series